Ileykino is a rural locality (a village) in Pershinskoye Rural Settlement, Kirzhachsky District, Vladimir Oblast, Russia. The population was 56 as of 2010. There are 8 streets.

Geography 
Ileykino is located on the Kirzhach River, 11 km south of Kirzhach (the district's administrative centre) by road. Dvorishchi is the nearest rural locality.

References 

Rural localities in Kirzhachsky District